The Durra gas field is an offshore natural gas field located in the neutral zone between Kuwait, and Saudi Arabia. It was discovered in 1967. It began production in 2013 and produces natural gas and condensates. The total proven reserves of the Arash gas field are around 20 trillion cubic feet (571×109m3) and production is slated to be around 1.5 billion cubic feet/day (43×106m3).

In December 2022, Saudi Aramco and Kuwait Gulf Oil Company signed a Memorandum of Understanding to develop the Durra field jointly. The development aims at producing 1 billion cubic feet of gas and 84,000 barrels of LNG per day.

References

Natural gas fields in Kuwait
Natural gas fields in Saudi Arabia